This article presents a list of the historical events and publications of Australian literature during 1990.

Events

 Tom Flood won the Miles Franklin Award for Oceana Fine

Major publications

Novels 
 Glenda Adams, Longleg
 Thea Astley, Reaching Tin River
 Tom Flood, Oceana Fine
 Sonya Hartnett, The Glass House
 Elizabeth Jolley, Cabin Fever
 David Malouf, The Great World
 Colleen McCullough, The First Man in Rome

Children's and young adult fiction 
 Isobelle Carmody, The Farseekers
 Gary Crew, Strange Objects
 Garth Nix, The Ragwitch
 Emily Rodda, Finders Keepers

Poetry 
 Lee Cataldi, Women who live on the ground: Poems, 1978-1988
 Jean Kent (poet), Verandahs
 Jennifer Maiden, The Winter Baby
 Les Murray (poet), Dog Fox Field
 Jan Owen, Fingerprints on Light

Drama 
 Hannie Rayson, Hotel Sorrento
 David Williamson, Siren (play)

Non-fiction 
 Dorothy Hewett, Wild Card

Awards and honours
 Yasmine Gooneratne , for "service to literature and to education"
 Harry Payne Heseltine , for "service to education, particularly in the field of Australian literature"
 Rodney Hall (writer) , for "service to the arts, particularly in the field of Australian literature"
 Andrew Taylor (poet) , for "service to the arts, particularly in the field of Australian literature"
 Elyne Mitchell , for "service to children's literature"

Births 
A list, ordered by date of birth (and, if the date is either unspecified or repeated, ordered alphabetically by surname) of births in 1990 of Australian literary figures, authors of written works or literature-related individuals follows, including year of death.
Unknown date
 Ellen van Neerven, Indigenous Australian writer and poet

Deaths 
A list, ordered by date of death (and, if the date is either unspecified or repeated, ordered alphabetically by surname) of deaths in 1990 of Australian literary figures, authors of written works or literature-related individuals follows, including year of birth.
 8 March — Jack Lindsay, novelist, biographer, historian and literary critic (born 1900)
 15 April — William Hart-Smith, poet (born 1911)
 30 September — Patrick White, novelist, playwright and short story writer (born 1912)
 21 June — Martin Johnston, poet and novelist (born 1947)

See also 
1990 in Australia
1990 in literature
 1990 in poetry
 List of years in literature
 List of years in Australian literature

References

1990 in Australia
Australian literature by year
20th-century Australian literature
1990 in literature